Lloyd Stowell Shapley (June 2, 1923 – March 12, 2016) was an American mathematician and Nobel Prize-winning economist. He contributed to the fields of mathematical economics and especially game theory. Shapley is generally considered one of the most important contributors to the development of game theory since the work of von Neumann and Morgenstern. With Alvin E. Roth, Shapley won the 2012 Nobel Memorial Prize in Economic Sciences "for the theory of stable allocations and the practice of market design."

Life and career 

Lloyd Shapley was born on June 2, 1923, in Cambridge, Massachusetts, one of the sons of astronomers Harlow Shapley and Martha Betz Shapley, both from Missouri. He attended Phillips Exeter Academy and was a student at Harvard when he was drafted in 1943. He served in the United States Army Air Corps in Chengdu, China and received the Bronze Star decoration for breaking the Soviet weather code.

After the war, Shapley returned to Harvard and graduated with an A.B. in mathematics in 1948. After working for one year at the RAND Corporation, he went to Princeton University where he received a Ph.D. in 1953 based on the thesis "Additive and non-additive set functions". His thesis and post-doctoral work introduced the Shapley value and the core solution in game theory.  Shapley defined game theory as "a mathematical study of conflict and cooperation." After graduating, he remained at Princeton for a short time before going back to the RAND corporation from 1954 to 1981. In 1950, while a graduate student, Shapley invented the board game So Long Sucker, along with Mel Hausner, John Forbes Nash, and Martin Shubik. Israeli economist Robert Aumann said Shapley was "the greatest game theorist of all time."

From 1981 until his death, Shapley was a professor at the University of California, Los Angeles (UCLA), serving at the time of his death as a professor emeritus there, affiliated with the Mathematics and Economics departments. He died on March 12, 2016, in Tucson, Arizona, after suffering from a broken hip, at the age of 92.

Shapley was an expert Kriegspiel player, and an avid baseball fan.

Contribution 

Along with the Shapley value, stochastic games, the Bondareva–Shapley theorem (which implies that convex games have non-empty cores), the Shapley–Shubik power index (for weighted or block voting power), the Gale–Shapley algorithm for the stable marriage problem, the concept of a potential game (with Dov Monderer), the Aumann–Shapley pricing, the Harsanyi–Shapley solution, the Snow–Shapley theorem for matrix games, and the Shapley–Folkman lemma & theorem bear his name. According to The Economist, Shapley "may have thought of himself as a mathematician, but he cannot avoid being remembered for his huge contributions to economics".  The American Economic Association noted that Shapley was "one of the giants of game theory and economic theory".

Besides, his early work with R. N. Snow and Samuel Karlin on matrix games was so complete that little has been added since. He has been instrumental in the development of utility theory, and it was he who laid much of the groundwork for the solution of the problem of the existence of Von Neumann–Morgenstern stable sets. His work with M. Maschler and B. Peleg on the kernel and the nucleolus, and his work with Robert Aumann on non-atomic games and on long-term competition have all appeared in economic theory.

Shapley argued with his sons about whether he should accept the Nobel Prize at all.  He opined that his father, the astronomer Harlow Shapley, deserved it more.  His sons persuaded him to accept it and accompanied him to Stockholm.

Awards and honors 

 Bronze Star, U.S. Army Air Corps, 1944
 Procter Fellow, Princeton University, 1951–52
 Fellow, Econometric Society, 1967
 Fellow, American Academy of Arts and Sciences, 1974
 Member, National Academy of Sciences, 1978
 John von Neumann Theory Prize, 1981
 Honorary Ph.D., Hebrew University of Jerusalem, 1986
 Fellow, INFORMS (Institute for Operations Research and the Management Sciences), 2002
 Distinguished Fellow, American Economic Association, 2007
 Fellow, American Mathematical Society, 2012
 Sveriges Riksbank Nobel Memorial Prize in Economic Sciences, 2012
 Golden Goose Award, 2013

Selected publications 

 A Value for n-person Games [1953], In Contributions to the Theory of Games volume II, H. W. Kuhn and A. W. Tucker (eds.).
 Stochastic Games [1953], Proceedings of National Academy of Science Vol. 39, pp. 1095–1100. 
 A Method for Evaluating the Distribution of Power in a Committee System [1954] (with Martin Shubik), American Political Science Review Vol. 48, pp. 787–792.
 College Admissions and the Stability of Marriage [1962] (with David Gale), The American Mathematical Monthly Vol. 69, pp. 9–15.
 Simple Games : An Outline of the Descriptive Theory [1962], Behavioral Science Vol. 7, pp. 59–66.
 On Balanced Sets and Cores [1967], Naval Research Logistics Quarterly Vol. 14, pp. 453–460.
 On Market Games [1969] (with Martin Shubik), Journal of Economic Theory Vol. 1, pp. 9–25.
 Utility Comparison and the Theory of Games [1969], La Decision, pp. 251–263.
 Cores of Convex Games [1971] International Journal of Game Theory Vol. 1, pp. 11–26.
 The Assignment Game I: The Core [1971] (with Martin Shubik), International Journal of Game Theory Vol. 1, pp. 111–130.
 Values of Non-Atomic Games [1974] (with Robert Aumann), Princeton University Press.
 Mathematical Properties of the Banzhaf Power Index [1979] (with Pradeep Dubey), Mathematics of Operations Research Vol. 4, pp. 99–132.
 Long-Term Competition – A Game-Theoretic Analysis [1994] (with Robert Aumann), in Essays in Game Theory: In Honor of Michael Maschler, Nimrod Megiddo (ed.), Springer-Verlag.
 Potential Games [1996] (with Dov Monderer), Games and Economic Behavior Vol. 14, pp. 124–143.
 On Authority Distributions in Organizations [2003] (with Xingwei Hu), Games and Economic Behavior Vol. 45, pp. 132–152, 153–170.
 Multiperson Utility [2008] (with Manel Baucells). Games and Economic Behavior Vol. 62, pp. 329–347.

See also 

 Matching theory (economics)

References

Further reading
Stable Marriage and Its Relation to Other Combinatorial Problems: An Introduction to the Mathematical Analysis of Algorithms, Donald E. Knuth, American Mathematical Society, 1997 (English Translation.)

External links 

 The Shapley Value
 Citation of von Neumann Theory Prize on L.S.Shapley's work: "Lloyd Shapley has dominated game theory for the thirty-seven years since von Neumann and Morgenstern published their path-breaking book, The Theory of Games and Economic Behavior."
 Albert Tucker's comment on L.S.Shapley's work. In 1995, Albert W. Tucker mentioned in his passing that Shapley was second only to Von Neumann as the most important researcher in theory of games so far. Philip Wolfe Interview by Irv Lustig, May 4, 2001.  Video by Irv Lustig, Short Hills, NJ.
  including the Nobel Lecture 
 Robert Aumann's Nobel lecture, also see here .
 UCLA – In Memoriam
 Biography of Lloyd S. Shapley from the Institute for Operations Research and the Management Sciences
 
 
 

 
1923 births
2016 deaths
People from Cambridge, Massachusetts
John von Neumann Theory Prize winners
American Nobel laureates
Nobel laureates in Economics
Members of the United States National Academy of Sciences
Fellows of the Econometric Society
Fellows of the Institute for Operations Research and the Management Sciences
Game theorists
Mathematical economists
RAND Corporation people
Probability theorists
20th-century American writers
21st-century American non-fiction writers
20th-century American economists
21st-century American economists
20th-century American mathematicians
21st-century American mathematicians
Harvard University alumni
Fellows of the American Mathematical Society
Distinguished Fellows of the American Economic Association
Economists from Massachusetts
United States Army Air Forces personnel of World War II
American expatriates in China
American people of German descent
Phillips Exeter Academy alumni